Dodworth is a village in the metropolitan borough of Barnsley in South Yorkshire, England. Historically part of the West Riding of Yorkshire, it has a population of 5,742, increasing to 5,900 at the 2011 Census (9,777 for Dodworth Ward).

History
Dodworth was historically a township in the ancient parish of Silkstone in the West Riding of Yorkshire. It became a separate civil parish in 1866, and an urban district in 1894. The urban district and civil parish were abolished in 1974, when Dodworth was transferred to the Metropolitan Borough of Barnsley in the new county of South Yorkshire.  Dodworth is now an unparished area.

Dodworth is a former coal mining village with approximately 5,800 people. The land occupying the former pit is now the Dodworth Business Park. The "muck" stack from the pit is clearly visible throughout the village. During the early 1980s a mass planting of silver birch trees began to halt erosion and create a wildlife habitat.  Over the past twenty years, trees and wildlife have flourished. Now the whole of the east, south and west side are covered with trees. The north side is occupied by farmland and the former 'muck stack' is completely invisible apart from the rise.
 
The crossroads between High Street, Station Road and Barnsley Road lead to Barnsley and Manchester. The crossroads acted as a trading point for salt brought from Cheshire during medieval times proving to be one of the oldest trading routes in the area. Along High Street are a number of old weavers' cottages.  These three-storey buildings supplied fine linen cloth to markets everywhere.. Opposite the library is one of the village's oldest buildings. It dates back to 1600, with evidence of this above its High Street front door.  During the village's 'hey-day', ten public houses over a half-mile (0.8 km) stretch of High Street reflected the large mining population at the time.

Current development
There are established private housing estates at Baslow Crescent and Strafford Walk. Extensive newer housing is at the eastern side of Dodworth around Water Royd Drive and Rose Hill Drive. The Water Royd Drive area is often referred to as the 'In and Out' estate by locals as many commuters from outside the village see this area as having easy access to the motorway links with house prices being reflective of their desirability. Further development is to the west with new housing at Champany Fields and Green Road, and luxury flats on Barnsley Road. These new homes are popular for commuters working in Barnsley, Sheffield, Manchester, Leeds and many other centres. There is employment locally at the Dodworth Business Park and at Fall Bank Industrial Estate.

In the past few years house prices have risen sharply, reflecting the popularity of living in the village. The soon to be relocated railway station has direct lines to Huddersfield and Barnsley. A new hotel and Toby Carvery has been built on Capitol Park close to the M1 motorway junction.

The Dodworth Bypass, near junction 37 on the M1, was completed in early 2007. The bypass allows commuters to travel from central Barnsley, or the motorway, to Silkstone and surrounding areas without travelling through Dodworth. A new business park called Capitol Park, part funded through the European Objective One scheme, is under construction along the bypass.

Pharmaceutical company Galpharm International operate from a purpose-built distribution and office complex in the village.

A memorial dedicated to the families of the 1,500 miners killed in the area has now been erected in a prominent position on the High Street.
A charity music festival was held at the Dodworth Miners' Welfare on 3 June 2012 to raise money for the memorial fund.

Transport

Proximity to the M1 Junction 37 means that Dodworth has a high proportion of commuters to Sheffield and Leeds. It also has easy access to Manchester along the A628 through Woodhead.

Dodworth railway station, on the Huddersfield to Sheffield line, provides access to Barnsley centre, Sheffield, Leeds and other nearby towns and cities.

There are two leading bus companies operating through Dodworth: Stagecoach and Tates. Recently there have been changes to service routes in the village, diverting buses from the main road to less populated areas.

The new road system linking the motorway junction to the A628 towards Silkstone and Manchester, has bypassed what was once a busy thoroughfare, producing a much quieter and sought-after retreat for villagers.

Amenities

Dodworth has three hotels. Brooklands Hotel (formerly Brooklands Motel), Ramada Encore and the Fairway Inn. Brooklands has been re-built by the Brook Group. It contains a restaurant, which stands on the site of the former restaurants that invented the Barnsley Chop, lounge bar, club and an on-site Bannatyne's health club.

Village pubs include the Travellers' Inn on Green Road, the Thornely Arms on High Street. There is also Dodworth Central Social Club and Gilroyd Social Club. Recent pubs to be built are the Fairway (formerly the Bluebell) & Dodworth Valley.

In July 2007 the Station Inn closed for refurbishment, and re-opened as an out-of-town wine bar. The Pheasant Inn was demolished in 2007 and is due to become residential housing. The Miners' Inn closed about 2003 and was converted to a children's nursery. The former Horse and Jockey has become an Indian restaurant.

Dodworth has two Indian restaurants, a Chinese take-away and two award-winning fish and chip shops. There is a Central England Co-operative supermarket on High Street, and a post office which includes a pharmacy, doctor's surgery and a beauty salon. Further shops specialise in music, shoes, crafts and hobbies and jewellery. There is also a sandwich outlet, café and a hairdresser's.

The Miners' Welfare has bowling greens, two football pitches, a cricket field and a rugby pitch. It is the home of the award-winning Dodworth Colliery M.W. Brass Band. Dodworth ARLFC compete in the Pennine Division One and won the Southwest Yorkshire Cup in the 2007–08 season.

Education
Dodworth has two primary schools, Keresforth Primary School and Dodworth St John the Baptist CofE Primary Academy. Dodworth St John (formerly Dodworth Junior School) amalgamated with Dodworth CofE Infant School in 2002.

Local secondary schools are Horizon Community College on Dodworth Road, and Penistone Grammar School in nearby Penistone.

Dodworth Branch Library is situated on High Street next to the war memorial. It functions as a local library, and provides internet access and 'Study Support' for local children.

Churches
There are three churches in Dodworth, Dodworth Methodist Church, St John the Baptist Parish Church with three military graves, and Rosehill Wesleyan Reform Church on Keresforth Road adjacent to the school.

Sport
Dodworth F.C. represented the village in the FA Cup during the 1920s.

Dodworth MWFC currently play in the Sheffield County Senior  premier division with Ex professional footballer Darren Young as 1st Team manager

Dodworth Miners ARLFC was established by Matthew Lock in June 2018 and competes in the Yorkshire Men's Summer League; it's predesesor Dodworth ARLFC (1980-2015) initially competed in the West Yorkshire Amateur League and later the National Conference League. DARLC was the idea (mainly) of Geoff Wake, Roger Mulroony and Andy Wade; Andy the club's first captain.

See also
Listed buildings in Dodworth
List of Yorkshire Pits

References

External links

Website about Dodworth

Villages in South Yorkshire
Unparished areas in South Yorkshire
Geography of the Metropolitan Borough of Barnsley